The Shandong Art Museum (山东省美术馆) is an art museum in the Lixia District of Jinan, China. First established in 1977, the museum relocated in a large building in 2013, near the Shandong Provincial Museum. It hosts a permanent collection of modern Chinese fine arts, and temporary exhibitions.

References

External links
 Official site

Art museums and galleries in China
1977 establishments in China